Tarik Bernard Black (born November 22, 1991) is an American professional basketball player for Olympiacos of the Greek Basket League and the EuroLeague. He has previously played for the Los Angeles Lakers and the Houston Rockets in the National Basketball Association (NBA). Black played college basketball for the University of Memphis and the University of Kansas.

High school career
Black attended Ridgeway High School in Memphis, Tennessee. As a junior in 2008–09, he averaged 15.7 points and 11.8 rebounds per game as he helped lead the Roadrunners to a 26–6 record and a District 15-AAA title. As a senior in 2009–10, he averaged 16.3 points and 12.6 rebounds as he helped lead the Roadrunners to a 26–3 record and a second District 15-AAA title.

College career

Memphis (2010–2013)
In his freshman season at Memphis, Black played in all 35 games and made 24 starts, including 18 of the final 19 contests, while averaging 9.1 points and 5.0 rebounds per game. He was subsequently named to the Conference USA All-Freshman team.

In his sophomore season, Black played in all 35 games and made 31 starts, while averaging 10.7 points, 4.9 rebounds, and 1.5 blocks per game. He also set the Memphis single-season field goal percentage record at 68.9 percent and was named to the All-Conference USA second team, All-Defensive team and All-Tournament team.

Black played in 32 games and made five starts his junior season, averaging 8.1 points and 4.8 rebounds in 20.8 minutes per game. He was named to the Tiger Academic 30 for the 2013 spring semester for having the highest grade-point average on the team.

Kansas (2013–2014)
On May 20, 2013, Black transferred to the University of Kansas after graduating from Memphis with a degree in organizational leadership, and was deemed eligible to play immediately. In his lone season for the Jayhawks, he was named the Big 12 Preseason Newcomer of the Year and went on to average 15.0 points per game in the NCAA Tournament. His season-high 19 points on 9-of-9 shooting on Senior Night was the best efficiency by a Jayhawk since 1990. In 33 games (15 starts), he averaged 5.5 points and 3.9 rebounds in 13.5 minutes per game.

Professional career

Houston Rockets (2014)
After going undrafted in the 2014 NBA draft, Black joined the Houston Rockets for the 2014 NBA Summer League. On August 27, 2014, he signed with the Rockets. On December 26, 2014, he was waived by the Rockets after appearing in 25 games.

Los Angeles Lakers (2014–2017)
On December 28, 2014, Black was claimed off waivers by the Los Angeles Lakers. On January 3, 2015, he was assigned to the Los Angeles D-Fenders of the NBA Development League. He was recalled the next day. On April 10, 2015, he recorded a season-best game with 18 points and 10 rebounds in a 106–98 win over the Minnesota Timberwolves.

During the 2015–16 season, Black received multiple assignments to the Los Angeles D-Fenders.

On August 24, 2016, Black re-signed with the Lakers. On July 1, 2017, he was waived by the Lakers.

Return to Houston (2017–2018)
On July 17, 2017, Black signed with the Houston Rockets, returning to the franchise for a second stint.

Maccabi Tel Aviv (2018–2020)
On August 20, 2018, Black signed a one-year deal with the Israeli team Maccabi Tel Aviv of the EuroLeague. On April 5, 2019, Black recorded a career-high 23 points, shooting 10-for-12 from the field, along with seven rebounds in a 78–75 loss to Fenerbahçe. On April 12, 2019, Black participated in the 2019 Israeli League All-Star Game, scoring 15 points and five rebounds off the bench. Black won the Israeli League championship title with Maccabi, earning a spot in the All-Israeli League Second Team.

On June 18, 2019, Black signed a two-year contract extension with Maccabi (with an NBA buy-out option until July 30). He parted ways with the team on May 23, 2020.

Zenit Saint Petersburg (2021)
On January 14, 2021, Black signed with Zenit Saint Petersburg of the VTB United League and the EuroLeague. On July 20, 2021, Black parted ways with the Russian club.

Grand Rapids Gold (2021–2022)
On September 27, 2021, Black signed with the Denver Nuggets. Black subsequently joined the Grand Rapids Gold as an affiliate player. In 15 games, he averaged 11.5 points, 7.9 rebounds, 2.1 assists and 1.3 blocks per game.

Bahçeşehir Koleji (2022)
On February 27, 2022, Black signed with Bahçeşehir Koleji of the Turkish Basketball Super League (BSL).

Olympiacos (2022–present) 
On July 31, 2022, Black signed a one-year deal with Olympiacos of the Greek Basket League and the EuroLeague.

Career statistics

NBA

Regular season

|-
| style="text-align:left;"| 
| style="text-align:left;"| Houston
| 25 || 12 || 15.7 || .542 || .000 || .517 || 5.1 || .3 || .2 || .1 || 4.2
|-
| style="text-align:left;"| 
| style="text-align:left;"| L.A. Lakers
| 38 || 27 || 21.1 || .589 || – || .562 || 6.3 || .9 || .3 || .6 || 7.2
|-
| style="text-align:left;"| 
| style="text-align:left;"| L.A. Lakers
| 39 || 0 || 12.7 || .548 || – || .422 || 4.0 || .4 || .4 || .5 || 3.4
|-
| style="text-align:left;"| 
| style="text-align:left;"| L.A. Lakers
| 67 || 16 || 16.3 || .510 || .500 || .752 || 5.1 || .6 || .4 || .7 || 5.7
|-
| style="text-align:left;"| 
| style="text-align:left;"| Houston
| 51 || 2 || 10.5 || .591 || .091 || .460 || 3.2 || .3 || .4 || .6 || 3.5
|- class="sortbottom"
| style="text-align:center;" colspan="2"| Career
| 220 || 57 || 15.1 || .550 || .143 || .582 || 4.7 || .5 || .4 || .5 || 4.9

Playoffs

|-
| style="text-align:left;"| 2018
| style="text-align:left;"| Houston
| 7 || 0 || 2.7 || .250 || – || – || .9 || .3 || .0 || .1 || .3
|-
| style="text-align:center;" colspan="2"| Career
| 7 || 0 || 2.7 || .250 || – || – || .9 || .3 || .0 || .1 || .3

EuroLeague

|-
| style="text-align:left;"| 2018–19
| style="text-align:left;"| Maccabi
| 26 || 24 || 21.5 || .694 || .000 || .684 || 5.4 || .7 || .5 || .8 || 11.0 || 13.8
|-
|- class="sortbottom"
| style="text-align:center;" colspan="2"| Career
| 26 || 24 || 21.5 || .694 || .000 || .684 || 5.4 || .7 || .5 || .8 || 11.0 || 13.8

Personal life
Black is the son of Lawrence and Judith Black, and has two brothers, Bilal and Amal.

Black earned his bachelor's degree from the University of Memphis and his master's degree from the University of Kansas.

References

External links

 Kansas Jayhawks bio
 Memphis Tigers bio
 Tarik Black at euroleague.net
 

1991 births
Living people
21st-century African-American sportspeople
African-American basketball players
American expatriate basketball people in Greece
American expatriate basketball people in Israel
American expatriate basketball people in Russia
American expatriate basketball people in Turkey
American men's basketball players
Bahçeşehir Koleji S.K. players
Basketball players from Memphis, Tennessee
BC Zenit Saint Petersburg players
Centers (basketball)
Grand Rapids Gold players
Houston Rockets players
Kansas Jayhawks men's basketball players
Los Angeles D-Fenders players
Los Angeles Lakers players
Maccabi Tel Aviv B.C. players
Memphis Tigers men's basketball players
Olympiacos B.C. players
Undrafted National Basketball Association players
United States men's national basketball team players